The Open delle Puglie is a WTA 125-level professional women's tennis tournament. It takes place on outdoor clay courts, in the month of September at the Circolo Tennis Bari in the city of Bari in Italy during the second week of US Open. The prize money is $115,000.

Results

Singles

Doubles

See also
 Open Città di Bari

References

Tennis tournaments in Italy
Clay court tennis tournaments
WTA 125 tournaments
Annual events in Italy
2022 establishments in Italy
Recurring sporting events established in 2022